Kuusik is an Estonian surname (meaning "spruce forest"), and may refer to:

Edgar-Johan Kuusik (1888–1974), architect
Harleth Kuusik (b. 1996), fashion model
Mart Kuusik (1877–1965), rower
Oliver Kuusik (born 1980), operatic tenor
Tiit Kuusik (1911–1990), operatic baritone
Timotheus Kuusik (1863–1940), teacher, translator, writer and politician

See also
Kuusk
Kuusiku (disambiguation)

Estonian-language surnames